Draycot Foliat is a hamlet in Wiltshire, England, on the back road between Chiseldon to the north and Ogbourne St. George to the south. A notable feature is the small airstrip with its model helicopter instruction centre. There is one smallholding, called Draycot Farm, and a larger farm, Sheppard's Farm, which comprises some 750 acres (300 hectares). Attached to Sheppard's farm is a small set of industrial buildings, most notably the Intellectual Property Law offices of Berry Davies LLP. In addition there are between ten and twenty other houses. The Og, a tributary of the River Kennet (itself a tributary of the Thames), flows for about half of the year down the centre of the hamlet, forcing the road into a sharp hairpin bend.

History
In 1086 it was recorded that Draycot had enough land for six ploughs, and at the time, there were two ploughs and a serf on five hides held in the demesne while there were three ploughs, four villeins and seven bordars on the remaining hides. There were in total  of pasture and eighteen of meadow at the time of the Domesday Survey. In 1849, King's farm was offered for sale and was bought by Draycot farm, giving the situation found today.

In 1894 the ancient parish of Draycot Foliat was added to the civil parish of Chiseldon.

It is possible that Draycot Foliat lent its name to the town of Dracut, incorporated in 1701 in Massachusetts.

The name
Since the earliest mentions of the settlement the name has been spelt in many ways including combinations of Draycot, Draycote, Draycott, Dreycot, and Dreycott with Foliat, Folliatt, Foliatt and Folyat and occasionally just Crawecot or just Draycote. The preferred spelling currently is Draycot Foliat and that name appears on a local signpost, however many maps and similar resources give the spelling of Draycott Foliat, considered incorrect by the inhabitants.

The Foliat suffix is from the Foliot family, who held the manor in the late 13th century.

The church
Draycot Foliat had a small church, and the nearby village of Chiseldon was considered within the Draycot parish; however, the situation was reversed in 1571 when Edmund Gheast became the Bishop of Sarum (Salisbury) and ordered the church be demolished. It was ordered, because neither Draycot nor neighbouring Chiseldon were wealthy enough to sustain their own rectors, that the two parishes be merged. Because the Chiseldon parish was larger, it was proposed that the Draycot parish be subsumed by it, and because Chiseldon's church was in a state of disrepair, the Bishop ordered that Draycot's church be demolished and the raw materials used to repair Chiseldon. Tradition has it that the extension to Holy Cross church Chiseldon known as Draycot aisle was constructed from these raw materials. The resulting parish was expected to pay the sum of five Shillings and twelve pence to the Deacon of Wiltshire every Passover. This order was signed, not only by Edmund Gheast, but also by both Edmond Chandoyes and Thomas Chaderton, the patrons of Chiseldon and Draycot and Christopher Dewe, the vicar of Chiseldon.

In some weathers, the outline of the church can still be made out and it appears to have been about seventy-five feet long and twenty wide. Today, Draycott Foliat is part of the parish of Chiseldon with Draycot Foliat, part of the Ridgeway Benefice in the Marlborough Deanery.

Chiseldon Camp
During the First World War there was a military camp at Draycot, and a long siding was built from the Midland and South Western Junction Railway at Chiseldon railway station to serve it. In 1930, a small railway station, Chiseldon Camp Halt was built on the main line about a mile south of Chiseldon station and about half a mile from the camp. The line and both railway stations closed in 1961.

In the Second World War an American army base was built on the other side of the road from Draycot. When the war ended, the Americans returned home but left a series of roads behind them. There are a few houses on these roads, built after the site was auctioned off in 1980. These houses can be considered as part of Draycot Foliat as they are within the original boundaries of the parish.

References

External links

 Google Maps
 Ridgeway Benefice website

Villages in Wiltshire
Former civil parishes in Wiltshire